Zhu Guisheng (1896 – March 2002), was the last surviving member of the Chinese Labour Corps (CLC).

In 1989 he received the French Legion of Honor.

First World War
Guisheng was from the Shandong province of China when in 1916 he signed a five-year contract to join the Chinese Labour Corps, through the Huimin Company. He possibly left Qingdao in August 1916, to join the Chinese Labour Corps in France. After the war, he remained in France.

Second World War
He worked with the French in the Second World War.

Personal and family
He married a French woman and they had two children. He worked as an electrician and had also operated cranes. In 1989, he was one of only two surviving CLC members who were awarded the French Legion of Honor.

Death
Guisheng died at the age of 106, in La Rochelle in March 2002. Until then he had been the last surviving member of the Chinese Labour Corps.

References

External links

1896 births
2002 deaths
Chinese Labour Corps soldiers
People from Shandong
Men centenarians